Enter Madame is a 1922 American silent romantic comedy film produced by Harry Garson for his star Clara Kimball Young. Wallace Worsley directed. The film was based on a 1920 Broadway play of the same name by Dolly Byrne and Gilda Varesi.  Prints of the film exist in two or three European archives. The film was remade under the same name in 1935.

Cast 
Clara Kimball Young as Prima Donna Lisa Della Robio
Elliott Dexter as Gerald Fitzgerald
Louise Dresser as Mrs. Flora Preston
Lionel Belmore as Archimede
Wedgwood Nowell as Doctor (*Wedgewood Nowell)
Rosita Marstini as Bice
Ora Devereaux as Miss Smith
Arthur Rankin as John Fitzgerald
Mary Jane Sanderson as Aline Chalmers
George Kuwa as Tomamoto

References

External links 

1922 films
American silent feature films
American films based on plays
Films directed by Wallace Worsley
American romantic comedy films
1922 romantic comedy films
American black-and-white films
Metro Pictures films
1920s American films
Silent romantic comedy films
Silent American comedy films